Sarı Süleyman Paşa (died 14 October 1687) was the grand vizier of the Ottoman Empire from 18 November 1685 to 18 September 1687. He was executed after the defeat of the Ottoman forces in the Second Battle of Mohács.

In Turkish, his epithet sarı means "blond (haired)", literally "yellow".

Early life
He was of Bosnian descent. Sarı Süleyman Pasha was born in Taşlıca (Pljevlja, now Montenegro), in the Bosnia Eyalet.

He was the kdhya of Grand Vizier Ahmed Köprülü (s. 1661–1676), and later the Sultan's master of the horse.

Grand Vizier of the Ottoman Empire
After Sarı Süleyman Pasha was appointed grand vizier, he immediately began to write desperate letters to the Great Khan of the Crimean Khanate and the pashas of Timișoara, Székesfehérvár and Osijek in order to reorganize and reinforce the battered Ottoman Army in Hungary, struggling during the Battle of Buda (1686). Although Sarı Süleyman Pasha made several attempts to break the blockade around Buda, the city was ultimately captured by Charles V, Duke of Lorraine. Soon afterwards the Ottomans had even lost Székesfehérvár.

Süleyman Pasha thereafter commanded his forces to hold what remained of the Ottoman north against their opponents and even sent Mehmet Agha to negotiate peace with Donat John Heissler at Guttentag.

After the defeat at Mohács, the Ottoman army started a rebellion against the grand vizier. Süleyman Pasha, fearful that the rebellion would result in his death, escaped from the commanding position, first to Belgrade and then, rather foolishly, to Constantinople, where he took refuge at the house of an old friend, a Jew named Salomon. At the beginning of September 1687, news about his defeat and escape came to Constantinople. After Mehmed IV received this news, he proclaimed Abaza Siyavuş Pasha as the new commander of the armed forces, and, eventually, as the new grand vizier. Soon after this, Süleyman Pasha was apprehended and executed. Two months later, the sultan himself was also removed from power as the result of the defeat in the Battle of Mohács, and was replaced by sultan Süleyman II.

See also
 List of Ottoman Grand Viziers
 Battle of Mohács (1687)

References

Sources

17th-century Grand Viziers of the Ottoman Empire
Executed people from the Ottoman Empire
Ottoman people of the Great Turkish War
17th-century executions by the Ottoman Empire
Year of birth unknown
1687 deaths
People from Prijepolje
Bosnian Muslims from the Ottoman Empire